Selce pri Špeharjih is a small village in the Municipality of Črnomelj in southeastern Slovenia. The village is part of the traditional region of White Carniola and is included in the Southeast Slovenia Statistical Region.

History
Selce pri Špeharjih was annexed by neighboring Breg pri Sinjem Vrhu in 1952. In 2000 it was separated from Breg pri Sinjem Vrhu, restoring its status as a separate settlement.

References

External links
Selce pri Špeharjih at Geopedia

Populated places in the Municipality of Črnomelj
Populated places established in 2000
2000 establishments in Slovenia